The 2001 Big Ten Conference baseball tournament was held at Bill Davis Stadium on the campus of Ohio State University in Columbus, Ohio, from May 15 through 19. The top six teams from the regular season participated in the double-elimination tournament, the twentieth annual tournament sponsored by the Big Ten Conference to determine the league champion.  won their seventh tournament championship and earned the Big Ten Conference's automatic bid to the 2001 NCAA Division I baseball tournament.

Format and seeding 
The 2001 tournament was a 6-team double-elimination tournament, with seeds determined by conference regular season winning percentage only.

Tournament

All-Tournament Team 
The following players were named to the All-Tournament Team.

Most Outstanding Player 
Jack Hannahan was named Most Outstanding Player. Hannahan was a third baseman for Minnesota.

References 

Tournament
Big Ten Baseball Tournament
Big Ten baseball tournament
Big Ten baseball tournament